Zwercheck is a mountain of the Bavarian Forest and Bohemian Forest, on the border between Germany and the Czech Republic.

Mountains of Bavaria
Mountains and hills of the Czech Republic
Bohemian Forest
Mountains of the Bavarian Forest